

Portrait of a Young Woman is a painting which is commonly believed to be by the Italian Renaissance painter Sandro Botticelli, executed between 1480 and 1485. Others attribute authorship to Jacopo da Sellaio. The woman is shown in profile but with her bust turned in three-quarter view to reveal a cameo medallion she is wearing around her neck. The medallion is a copy in reverse of "Nero's Seal", a famous antique carnelian representing Apollo and Marsyas, which belonged to Lorenzo de' Medici.

It is housed in the Städel Museum of Frankfurt, Germany. Other similar Botticelli paintings are to be found in the National Gallery, London, the Gemäldegalerie, Berlin, and in the Marubeni Collection, Tokyo.

The art historian Aby Warburg first suggested the painting was an idealised portrait of Simonetta Vespucci.

This challenged a previous interpretation, put forward by German scholars, according to which the painting describes an ideally beautiful young woman mythologised as a nymph or goddess, a view reflected in the title given it by the Städel. It belongs to a group of such paintings by Botticelli or his workshop. Art historian Emanuele Lugli has suggested that the three "tassels" of hair at the center of the painting represents downward flames, symbolising the love that onlookers ought to experience when looking at the portrait since, in the Renaissance it was thought that "hair inflames desire."

Gallery

Sources
References

Bibliography

External links 

 National Gallery of Art – Virtue and Beauty: Leonardo's Ginevra de' Benci and Renaissance Portraits of Women

Young Woman
1480s paintings
Young Woman, Botticelli, Frankfurt
Paintings in the collection of the Städel
Young Woman (Botticelli, Frankfurt)